Carl Sandreczki (1809 – 1892) was a German missionary in Palestine.

Biography
Carl Sandreczki, a Bavarian, studied law at Munich University. He served as a judge under the administration of King Otto I of Greece, on the Cycladic island of Syros in the Aegean Sea. After converting from Catholicism to Protestantism, he was appointed secretary of the Church Missionary Society in Jerusalem.

Sandreczki conducted a 10-day survey in which he documented the streets, gates and buildings of the city for the Ordnance Survey of Jerusalem and provided the Arabic names for locations, as well as two maps - one of the city, and one of the Temple Mount.The survey, Namen der Plätze, appeared in a shorter English version in Wilson's Ordnance Survey.

Carl Sandreczki's son, Max Sandreczky, was a pediatric surgeon in Jerusalem.

Published works
Carl Sandreczki (1867). "Die Heuschreckenplage in Palästina" [The plague of locusts in Palestine]. Wochenblatt der Johanniterballey Brandenburg VIII, Nr. 5. 6, pp. 29-36
Carl Sandreczki (1868). "Warren's Ausgrabungen in Jerusalem" [Warren's excavations in Jerusalem]. Gotha: Mittheilungen aus Justus Perthes' Geographischer Anstalt über wichtige neue Erforschungen auf dem Gesammtgebiete der Geographie 14, pp. 290-94
Carl Sandreczki (1871). "Briefe aus Palästina" [Letters from Palestine]. Das Ausland 44, p. 810
Carl Sandreczki (1872). "Zur alten Geographie Palästinas" [On the ancient geography of Palestine]. Das Ausland 5, pp. 73-78, 97-103
Carl Sandreczki (1874). "Wozu uns Deutsche der "Palestine Exploration Fund" ermahnt" [What the "Palestine Exploration Fund" prompts us Germans to do]. Das Ausland 47, pp. 114-15

See also
Christianity in Israel

References

Bibliography

 
 

German Protestant missionaries
1808 births
1892 deaths
Converts to Protestantism from Roman Catholicism
German expatriates in the Ottoman Empire
Expatriates in Ottoman Palestine
Protestant missionaries in Palestine (region)